Cauco is a former municipality in the district of Moesa in the Swiss canton of Graubünden. On 1 January 2015 the former municipalities of Arvigo, Braggio, Cauco and Selma merged to form the new municipality of Calanca.

History
The church at Cauco is first mentioned in 1497.  The village was part of the Squadra di Calanca until 1851 when it became an independent municipality.

Geography
Of this area, 8.8% is used for agricultural purposes, while 49.5% is forested. Of the rest of the land, 1.6% is settled (buildings or roads) and the remainder (40.1%) is non-productive (rivers, glaciers or mountains).

The former municipality is located in the Calanca sub-district of the Moesa district. It is on a scree slope from a prehistoric rock slide. It consists of the village of Cauco and the hamlets of Lasciallo, Masciadone and Bodio (GR).

Demographics
Cauco had a population (as of 2013) of 35.  , 2.8% of the population was made up of foreign nationals.  Over the last 10 years the population has decreased at a rate of -4.9%.  Most of the population speaks Italian (73.0%), with German being second most common (24.3%) and French being third ( 2.7%).

, the gender distribution of the population was 51.3% male and 48.7% female.  The age distribution, in Cauco is; 1 child is between 0 and 9 years old.  There are no teenagers who are 10 to 14, and 4 teenagers or 10.8% of the population who are 15 to 19.  Of the adult population, 3 people or 8.1% of the population are between 20 and 29 years old.  4 people or 10.8% are 30 to 39, 3 people or 8.1% are 40 to 49, and 6 people or 16.2% are 50 to 59.  The senior population distribution is 5 people or 13.5% of the population are between 60 and 69 years old, 6 people or 16.2% are 70 to 79, there are 4 people or 10.8% who are 80 to 89, and there is 1 person who is 90 to 99.

In the 2007 federal election the most popular party was the SP which received 48.6% of the vote.  The next three most popular parties were the CVP (22.9%), the SVP (20%) and the FDP (6.7%).

The entire Swiss population is generally well educated.  In Cauco about 76.4% of the population (between age 25-64) have completed either non-mandatory upper secondary education or additional higher education (either University or a Fachhochschule).

Cauco has an unemployment rate of 1.19%.  , there were 8 people employed in the primary economic sector and about 3 businesses involved in this sector.  3 people are employed in the secondary sector and there is 1 business in this sector.  2 people are employed in the tertiary sector, with 1 business in this sector.

The historical population is given in the following table:

Notable people 
 Roger Sablonier (1941–2010), Swiss historian and writer, University of Zürich faculty

References

External links
 Official website 
 

Calanca
Former municipalities of Graubünden